Jan-Erik Lundqvist (born 14 April 1937) is a Swedish former international tennis player. During the entire 1960s he was Sweden's best tennis player.

At the height of his career, he won at least 35 international titles and played 91 Davis Cup-matches from 1957 to 1970.

Lundqvist was ranked among the 10 best amateur players (rankings made by leading tennis journalist Lance Tingay at the Daily Telegraph) in the world during most of the 1960s, reaching as high as world No. 3 in 1964.

Lundqvist declined professional offers from Jack Kramer in 1960 and 1965.

Davis Cup anchor
The Swedish Davis Cup team with Lundqvist as anchor reached the Inter-Zonal final against Mexico in 1962 and Australia in 1964. Lundqvist is the most successful Davis Cup single player Sweden has ever had with his 47 wins.

35 international titles in 46 finals
In 1964 he won, among other titles, Italian Open and was ranked number 3 in the world after Roy Emerson and Fred Stolle.

In 1965 Lundqvist was appointed the best indoor player in the world after winning the National Indoor Championships (now the U.S. National Indoor Tennis Championships), French Open Indoors (1962, 1963, 1966), German Open Indoors, and Scandinavian Indoor Championships (1960, 1963, 1967, 1970).

Other major championships that Lundqvist won was the British Hard Court Championships in 1965 and 1967, the Pacific Coast Championships in 1962, the South American Outdoor Championships (nowadays the ATP Buenos Aires) in 1962 and the Swedish Open in 1963.

Grand Slam tournaments
Lundqvist reached the semi-finals twice (1961 and 1964) at the French Open. Both times he lost to the Italian player Nicola Pietrangeli.

During 1958-1965 the official documentations say that Lundqvist participated 7 times in the French Open, 6 times in The Championships, Wimbledon, 1 time in US Open (tennis) and 1 time in Australian Open.

Tennis career
As a tennis player, Jan-Erik was known for his aggressive playing style hitting the ball a long distance in front of the body. He had a very good first serve, and he could hit surprisingly hard sliced and totally unreachable stop balls. he had his best successes on clay and outdoor courts. He had in his strongest form in the beginning of the 1960s with few superiors on clay, defeating players such as Manuel Santana, Nicola Pietrangeli, Fred Stolle, Roy Emerson and Neale Fraser.

See also
 List of Sweden Davis Cup team representatives

References

External links
 
 
 
 Stockholms Tennishall, Janne Lundqvist
 Swedish Tennis Hall of Fame

1937 births
Living people
Swedish male tennis players
Tennis players from Stockholm